is a Japanese manga series written by Shigemitsu Harada and illustrated by Nobuto Hagio. It was serialized in Hakusensha's seinen manga magazine Young Animal from 2006 to January 22, 2010. Its chapters were collected twelve in tankōbon volumes.

In December 2006, the Kanagawa Prefecture classified the book as harmful to minors per the prefectural youth protection laws.

A drama CD was released in 2008. A live-action adaptation was announced starring Shelly Fujii which was released in 2009.

Plot
Dr. Akiba, a perverted scientist, has developed a series of gynoid Dutch wives (aka sex dolls). Yuria Type 100 is his newest creation: she has highly advanced artificial intelligence and vast sexual knowledge, and the first doll which can imprint to her master for life upon having actual sex. However, she refuses to imprint onto Akiba, and escapes from his lab. She ends up living with college student Shunsuke Kubo, where she tries to seduce him with the hopes that he can be her master, as however, he regularly refuses because he has a girlfriend and because he sees her as incredibly annoying when she acts like that. The series follows her everyday life as she tries to seduce Shunsuke. Other Dutch wife gynoids soon appear, some of whom were also invented by Akiba, thus making them Yuria's sisters, and others from competing companies. Throughout the series, there are commentaries about the technical specs of the sexual capabilities of the Yuria and other models.

Characters

Main characters
 Yuria is a  female android designed with the sole purpose of being a highly interactive sex doll. Not wanting to engage in sex with her inventor, she escapes and meets Kubo Shunsuke, who gives her a place to stay. She finds herself strongly attracted to him but struggles with her programming that tells her just to please him sexually whenever she can.
  is a college student who takes in Yuria, thinking she is a runaway. He treats her like a little sister despite the latter's strange physical advances on him, which he retaliates with different grappling holds from his hobby of pro wrestling to keep her at bay.

Supporting characters

Humans
 is the creator of the Yuria series sex dolls, that have the habit of escaping from him once completed.
 is introduced as Shunsuke's fiancée. She is the proud daughter of a wealthy family from Shunsuke's home town, and often expresses jealous feelings. Later, she marries Shunsuke and starts living with him and Yuria.
 is introduced as 17-year-old high school student who lets Juria stay with him. He enjoys collecting dolls and prefers them over real girls, but his interactions with Juria bother his mother. However, when he turns 18, he officially accepts Juria.
 is a university student studying to be elementary school teacher. He incidentally becomes Yurin's guardian. Despite Yurin's attempts to have sex to him, Ippei just sees her as a child and tries to resist her advances for fear of being seen as a pedophile.

Gynoids
 Juria is a  model gynoid and the second of Akiba's functional dolls. She has long, dark hair and dresses in a maid costume. Also disliking Akiba's perversions, she escapes and lives as a life-size doll in Yoshio's room but restricts herself from sexually interacting with Yoshio until he turns 18.
 Yurin in a  model gynoid and the third of Akiba's functional dolls. She too does not like Akiba's perversions, and escapes, ending up with Ippei. Her child figure is capable of growing and developing according to her user's preferences as long as she is used that way.
 , is a gynoid created using a special silicon polymer capable of easily changing her form, in a parody of the T-1000. Like her predecessors, she escaped from the laboratory, but without having her personality program installed, and thus she sexually assaults anyone at sight without warning. After attacking the other Yurias, she obtained data from her respective partners and goes after them as well.
 Lucy is a  gynoid created in America and sent to Japan to be a rival of Yuria. Her specialty is in the American and European market, and is specialized to engage in "hardcore" sex. She is scouted to work as a model and spokesperson, but her sex-driven programming is a constant source of chagrin to her employers, who are unaware of her true identity.
 Louie is a  android created in America. Due to budget cuts the Lucy 3 and Lucy 4 programs were merged, and the result is that Louie has the top half of a woman and the bottom half of a man.

Media

Manga

Volume list

|}

Live-action
A live action adaptation was released on November 20, 2009 in Japan. Yuria is played by Shelly Fujii and the movie is directed by Hideo Jojo (Gachi-ban).

See also
Cells at Work! Code Black - another manga series written by Shigemitsu Harada.
Ippatsu Kiki Musume - another manga series by Shigemitsu Harada.
Majo wa Mioji Kara - another manga series written by Shigemitsu Harada.
Megami no Sprinter - another manga series written by Shigemitsu Harada.
Motoyome - another manga series written by Shigemitsu Harada

References

External links
 Official Young Animal Yuria Hyaku Shiki website 
 
  
 

2006 manga
Live-action films based on manga
Fictional gynoids
Hakusensha franchises
Hakusensha manga
Manga adapted into films
Romantic comedy anime and manga
Science fiction anime and manga
Seinen manga
Sex comedy anime and manga
Wrestling in anime and manga
Japanese science fiction films
Japanese romantic comedy films
Japanese sex comedy films